Emili Pérez Font (born 3 October 1966) is an Andorran former cyclist. He competed at the 1988 Summer Olympics and the 1992 Summer Olympics.

References

External links
 

1966 births
Living people
Andorran male cyclists
Olympic cyclists of Andorra
Cyclists at the 1988 Summer Olympics
Cyclists at the 1992 Summer Olympics
People from Escaldes-Engordany